Ogurtsov (masculine) or Ogurtsova (feminine) is a Russian last name. Possibly a variant of the last name Agureyev, it might also be a derivative from the nickname "" (Ogurets), which literally means cucumber. This possibility, however, is discounted by some researchers.

People with the last name
Alexey Ogurtsov, Russian actor who played Spirid in the 2014 dark fantasy movie Viy
Artyom Ogurtsov, Russian association football player who played for PBC CSKA Moscow in 1999–2000
Bazhen Ogurtsov, an architect who contributed to the construction of the Spasskaya Tower of the Moscow Kremlin
Dmitry Ogurtsov, Russian ice hockey player 2011 HC CSKA Moscow draft pick
Dmitry Ogurtsov, member of the Young Guard, a Soviet resistance group
Igor Ogurtsov, co-founder of VSHSON, an underground anti-Soviet organization
Nikolay Ogurtsov (b. 1996), Russian association football player
Mariya Ohurtsova (Ogurtsova) (b. 1983), retired Ukrainian swimmer
Sergey Ogurtsov, birth name of Sergey Lemokh (b. 1965), Russian singer
Sergey Ogurtsov, head of Sochi Police, Russia

Fictional characters
Serafim Ogurtsov, a character in the 1956 Soviet musical Carnival Night

See also
Ogurtsovo, several rural localities in Russia

References

Notes

Sources
И. М. Ганжина (I. M. Ganzhina). "Словарь современных русских фамилий" (Dictionary of Modern Russian Last Names). Москва, 2001. 
Ю. А. Федосюк (Yu. A. Fedosyuk). "Русские фамилии: популярный этимологический словарь" (Russian Last Names: a Popular Etymological Dictionary). Москва, 2006. 

Russian-language surnames
